Kevin Keane  (born 1990) is a Gaelic footballer who plays for Westport. He previously played for the Mayo county team.

He started at right corner-back in the 2012 All-Ireland SFC Final, which Mayo lost by four points to Donegal.

Keane was sent off for slapping Michael Murphy in an off-the-ball incident during Mayo's 2015 All-Ireland SFC quarter-final against Donegal.

He attended Rice College and played football for the school. Lee Keegan attended Rice College at the same time and played with Keegan on the school team.

References

1990 births
Living people
Gaelic football backs
Mayo inter-county Gaelic footballers
Westport Gaelic footballers